Tudor Queen (foaled 1967 in Kentucky) was a Champion Thoroughbred racehorse in Canada and the United States. In 1969 she was voted American Champion Two-Year-Old Filly by the Thoroughbred Racing Association.

Background
Her British sire was King of the Tudors, a multiple stakes winner whose wins included the 1953 Sussex Stakes and 1954 Eclipse Stakes. Grandsire Tudor Minstrel won a British Classic, the 1947 2,000 Guineas Stakes. Tudor Queen's dam was Royal Dowry, a granddaughter of the great Nearco through his son, Royal Charger.

Purchased by Jack Stafford, owner of Stafford Farms in King, Ontario, Tudor Queen was conditioned for racing by future Canadian Horse Racing Hall of Fame inductee Gil Rowntree who was based at Woodbine Racetrack in Toronto, Ontario, Canada.

Racing career
As a two-year-old the filly had her best year in racing, winning four important stakes races in Canada and the Frizette Stakes at Belmont Park in Elmont, New York. At year's end, she was voted the 1969 American Champion Two-Year-Old Filly by the Thoroughbred Racing Association, with Fast Attack topping the rival Daily Racing Form poll. The award made her the de facto Canadian Two Year-Old Champion in the pre-Sovereign Award era.

Tudor Queen raced at age three and four, notably winning the 1970 Duchess Handicap at her home base and the following year, the Nettie Handicap.

Breeding record
After she was retired to broodmare duty, Tudor Queen's offspring met with limited racing success.

Pedigree

References

1967 racehorse births
Thoroughbred family 13-c
Racehorses bred in Kentucky
Racehorses trained in Canada
Canadian Champion racehorses
American Champion racehorses